Judi Ann Mason (February 2, 1955 – July 8, 2009) was an American television writer, producer and playwright.

Background

Mason was born in Bossier City, Louisiana on February 2, 1955.  She excelled in English and became interested in playwrighting while in high school. Her professional writing career began while a drama student at Grambling State University.

Career

While attending Grambling, she won the Norman Lear Award for comedy writing from the Kennedy Center for the Performing Arts for her play, Livin’ Fat. The following year she won the Lorraine Hansberry Playwriting Award for A Star Ain’t Nothin’ But A Hole In Heaven. The New York Times said that Mason had created "captivating characters" in her play, but that she had forfeited letting main character Pokie face the decision between romance and a better life, when the character's boyfriend ends up joining the war in Vietnam.

Mason was selected as one of Glamour Magazines Top Ten College women in 1977, as was her friend Sheryl Lee Ralph, an actress.

Mason began her professional writing career in New York city where she was a member of the NEC (Negro Ensemble Company). She has taught playwriting and screenwriting at a number of colleges and universities for more than 20 years. In 2010 she was teaching screenwriting at Columbia College of Hollywood. 
 
Her television writing credits include Good Times, Sanford and Son, A Different World, Beverly Hills, 90210, I'll Fly Away, American Gothic, Generations, and Guiding Light.

Her film credits include Sister Act 2: Back in the Habit. She is also renowned for Sophie And The Moonhanger, nominated for the Emmy Award/CableACE Award. Her stageplay credits include The Cornbread Man and Indigo Blues.

Mason counted Patti LaBelle, LaTonya Richardson, Jennifer Holliday and Jheryl Busby as personal friends. She is the one who gave Patti LaBelle her first acting credit on TV on the show A Different World.

She was a mother of two, daughter Mason Synclaire Williams and son Austin Barrett Williams. Mason died unexpectedly of a ruptured abdominal aorta on July 8, 2009.

References

External links

www.stageplays.com
www.variety.com
www.stainedglassplayhouse.org
www.blacktheatrenetwork.org

African-American dramatists and playwrights
American soap opera writers
2009 deaths
1955 births
Grambling State University alumni
People from Bossier City, Louisiana
Deaths from aortic dissection
American women dramatists and playwrights
Women soap opera writers
20th-century American dramatists and playwrights
20th-century American women writers
Screenwriters from Louisiana
20th-century American screenwriters
African-American screenwriters
20th-century African-American women writers
20th-century African-American writers
21st-century African-American people
21st-century African-American women